Claudio Edinger is a  Brazilian photographer born in Rio de Janeiro in 1952. He lived in New York from 1976 to 1996.

Biography

Edinger  studied economics at Mackenzie University in São Paulo, Brazil. At the same time, in the beginning of the Seventies, he began taking photographs. In 1975 he had his first individual exhibition, at the São Paulo Museum of Art, with photographs of the Martinelli Building, a vertical slum in downtown São Paulo. The following year he moved to New York City and lived there until 1996. 

Throughout the 20 years he spent in the United States, Edinger developed personal photographic essays. He also worked as a freelance photographer for Brazilian and North American newspapers and magazines such as Veja, Time, Newsweek, Life, Rolling Stone, Vanity Fair, The New York Times Magazine, among many others. In 1977 he studied with Philippe Halsman (1906–1979), the great master portraitist.

In 1978 after two years photographing the Hassidic Jews in Brooklyn, Edinger had an individual exhibit "Hassidic Jews” at the International Center of Photography in New York. From 1979 to 1994 Edinger taught classes at Parson's/New School for Social Research and at the International Center of Photography (1992–1994). 

During the time Claudio lived in New York City, he published three books: Chelsea Hotel –1983, Venice Beach –1985 both by Abbeville Press, (both received the Leica Medal of Excellence), and The Making of Ironweed, published by Viking Penguin, about the film directed by Hector Babenco, written by William Kennedy, with Meryl Streep and Jack Nicholson. In 1986 Claudio started photographing for a book about India.

In 1989 and 1990 Claudio photographed the Juqueri Psychiatric Hospital, in São Paulo, where he lived for two weeks. Madness  was published by DBA, DAP and by Dewi Lewis Publishing in 1997. Edinger received the Ernst Haas Award in 1990 for this work. 

From 1991 to 1996, Claudio photographed carnaval in Brazil's five different regions: Rio de Janeiro, Salvador, Recife/Olinda, São Paulo, and Paraty. When he returned to Brazil in 1996, Edinger published Carnaval, by DBA, DAP and Dewi Lewis (England). In 1999 Carnaval won the Higashikawa Prize in Japan.

Between 1994 and 1996, Claudio photographed the old part of Havana, Cuba. Old Havana  was published in 1997 by Dewi Lewis, Edition Stemmle, DBA and DAP. That same year the book was named by American Photo as one of the best books of the year. 

In 1999, the book Vitória, city of the islands, about the capital of the Espirito Santo State in Brazil, was published by Abooks. In 2000 Edinger published Cityscapes, with photographs of New York. In 2001, Portraits, a collection of photos done for his books and for magazines. Both books were published by DBA.

In 2006 the book Flesh and Spirit, an anthology of 30 years of his work, was published by Umbrage and DBA.

Claudio began working with a large format, 4x5 camera, in 2000, to photograph the city where he was born, Rio de Janeiro. Rio was published in 2003 by DBA. It was named one of the best books of the year by Photo District News.

His book: São Paulo: minha estranha cidade linda also done with a large format camera, came out in March 2009, published by DBA and has received the Porto Seguro Award in Brazil.

Photographic career 

Claudio Edinger was born in Rio de Janeiro in May 1952 and before his second birthday his family moved to São Paulo. He has said that in his mind he has often thought his soul was in São Paulo and his heart in Rio. This love of both places, he believes, shows in his photographs of both cities.

Edinger may well be the contemporary master of the photographic series. Taking his cue from Tolstoy's phrase, "without knowing who I am, life is impossible", Edinger, from the beginning of his career, has used his camera as a research tool trying to explore his chosen subject matter in great detail, often to its depths. It is research that is often highly charged emotionally both to Edinger and to the viewer of his photographs. 

Edinger's first series of photographs began in 1975 when he chose to explore the Martinelli Building in São Paulo, his home city. At one time the Martinelli was the tallest and most exclusive apartment building in São Paulo. When Edinger began his (photographic) essay on the Building, it had been reduced to a vertical slum.
One can say that by exploring a subject in depth, Edinger had set the template of his aesthetic that the camera can be used to explore in depth which has resulted in over thirteen books dealing with specific subjects.
In order to widen his knowledge of the world and to try to examine his own roots, Edinger left Brazil for New York, which was then the heart and center of the photographic world.  Edinger chose to live among and photograph the Hassidic Jews of Brooklyn. In a series of startling black and white photographs taken over two years, Edinger was able to capture a broad portrait of  the traditions and joys of the Hassidic community.  After being introduced to Cornell Capa by Philippe Halsman in 1978, he was invited to exhibit his depiction of Brooklyn's Hassidic life at the International Center of Photography. 

After Edinger's stay in Brooklyn, he moved to the historic Chelsea Hotel, a Bohemian, for want of a better word, oasis where many notable people in the arts and eccentrics chose to live either in transit or permanently. Among the many residents, at one time or another, were many painters who had studios there as well as musicians such as Bob Dylan, Virgil Thompson, Jimi Hendrix and Janis Joplin who spent time there. Edinger photographed in telling, but sympathetic portraits many of the famous, as well as the eccentric personalities who were never to become famous who inhabited the world of the Chelsea Hotel in the late 1970s. The series of portraits resulted in Edinger's first large scale book, "Chelsea Hotel" published by Abbeville Press in 1983. The book, his first solely of portraits, was a landmark achievement in exploring diverse group of eccentric people often having only one thing in common, their residence at the Chelsea Hotel. The book is a classic photographic record of the late 70's, early 80s.

From the Chelsea, in 1984, Edinger moved to Venice Beach, California. During the late 1960s and '70s, Venice Beach was a center of the counter-culture and a fertile field for Edinger's camera, photographing the many odd and the bizarre people who had come there to be near the sea and enjoy the beach culture. In a sense this was an extension of Edinger's work at the Chelsea Hotel, but here the people had not only pretensions to the arts, but were also concerned with their bodies and the beach. The series of photographs Edinger took at this time allowed the photographer to put his subjects in a wider landscape than the narrow confines of the Chelsea Hotel. In a sense the book, "Venice Beach", that resulted from this period is pivotal in Edinger's development as it prepared him for his next adventure when he went to India in 1986.

Edinger's transition to India became a period of great creative and spiritual experiment and growth. He began to use color in his photographs and the holy city of Varanasi played a vital role in awakening his dormant recognition of his own need for a deeper spirituality that had begun in Brooklyn. Using a newly acquired Hasselblad camera, he was able to photograph in medium format the excitement and whirl of people and places of India that in many ways captures the essence of India as both an accepted insider and a foreigner discovering the essence of the country's spiritual nature. This has resulted in the ongoing project of a series of photographs of Northern India.

Upon his return to Brazil Edinger had to cope with the reality of trying to understand the consequences of Alzheimer's disease on a most personal nature. His beloved grandmother had been affected by the disease and he was moved to bring attention to the treatment of madness and dementia in Brazil and possibly in other places in the world where the mentally ill are often warehoused in asylums and become even more truly mad, This led to his series of photographs inside the Juqueri, Latin America's largest insane asylum. In order to seek out and understand the depth of what occurs there Edinger moved inside the asylum to live among the people housed there. The result of his search was the receipt of the Ernst Haas Award from the Maine Photographic Workshop. When he showed these harrowing photographs to Cornell Capa, he was met with the question, "Who would want to see this?" After seven years of showing the work around to various publishers it was finally accepted and published by DBA (Brazil) and Dewi Lewis (UK) and it is now a seminal work of photography depicting the mentally ill. 
While seeking publication of Madness, Edinger began a project that was to occupy him for the next five years: the photographing of Brazil's Carnaval, the institutionalized madness of Brazil. From 1991 to 1995 he photographed five different regions of Brazil - Rio, Salvador, Recife/Olinda, São Paulo and Paraty during Carnaval. The book was published in 1996. This project established Edinger as a truly Brazilian photographer, now with an established international reputation, back on to his native soil after twenty years abroad in New York.

Other books followed. Old Havana, a portrait in color of the decay of a once exquisite colonial architecture kept barely alive by its vibrant inhabitants. This book was published simultaneously in English, Portuguese and German.

In 2000 Edinger's Cityscapes was published by DBA (Brazil).  It is an autobiographical work of reflection and discovery about his time in New York as a photographer living in a foreign city.  Using an outsider's view to see and experience one of the most photographed cities in the world Edinger was able to photograph the city in a fresh way.

This prepared him for his return to Brazil to confront through his photography, in the year 2000, the city of Rio where he was born. There, through his camera, this time using a large format Sinar 4 x 5 and black and white film, the ambiguity of spaces in large cities that he first found in New York is realized. What emerges is a very personal series of photos that excite the viewer as well as the photographer showing the connection to his subject matter in the most intimate and poetic way.  Working with selective focus and a large format camera Edinger's work has evolved into a somewhat surreal study that one art critic has called the invention of neo-expressionism in photography. It is one of the most personal statements by a photographer now practicing his art.

The books that have subsequently come from his use of the large format camera and his experimental use of color, notably his most recent exploration of São Paulo have been a giant step in Edinger's work resulting in a widening acceptance of Edinger's photographs in exhibitions at art galleries, museums and private collections.

Books

 Quarentena - Vento Leste Ed. - 2022
 Machina Mundi - Sub Specie Aeterni - Vento Leste Ed. - 2020
História da Fotografia Autoral e a Pintura Moderna - Ipsis Ed. - 2019
 Machina Mundi - Bazar do Tempo Ed. - 2017
 O Paradoxo do Olhar - Estudio Madalena 2014
 From Jesus to Miracles – BEI 2012 
 Um Swami no Rio - (novel) Annablume 2009 
 São Paulo - Minha Estranha Cidade Linda - DBA 2009
 Flesh and Spirit - DBA and Umbrage 2006
 Rio - DBA 2003
 Citiscapes - DBA 2001
 Vitoria - Abooks 2000
 Portraits - DBA, ABooks 1999
 São Paulo Under Construction – ABooks 1998
 Madness - DBA, DAP, Dewi Lewis 1997
 Old Havana - DBA, DAP, Dewi Lewis, Editions Stemmle 1997
 Carnaval - DBA, Dewi Lewis, DAP 1996
 The Making of Ironweed - Viking Penguin 1987
 Venice Beach - Abbeville Press 1985
 Chelsea Hotel - Abbeville Press 1983

Awards

 Leica Medal of Excellence | 1983 | Chelsea Hotel 
 Leica Medal of Excellence | 1985 | Venice Beach
 Life magazine Award | Finalist of W. Eugene Smith Grant | 1989 | Madness 
Ernst Haas Award |1990 | Madness
 One of the year's best books | American Photo | 1997 | Old Havana
 Vitae Foundation Scholarship | 1993 | Brazilian Carnaval
 Japan Foundation Scholarship | 1997 | Hong Kong 
 Pictures of the Year | 1996 | Best Photo in a Magazine - Newsweek
 Higashikawa Award (Japan) | 1999 | Best Foreign Photographer | Carnaval 
 PDN Photo Annual | 2003 | One of the year's best personal projects | Rio 
 PDN Photo Annual | 2006 | One of the year's best books | Rio 
 Porto Seguro Award | 2007 | São Paulo 4x5 
 2009 Best Photographic Book | 2009 | CLIX Magazine | São Paulo
 Porto Seguro Award | 2010 | Sertão da Bahia
 PDN Photo Annual | 2010 | One of the year's best personal projects | Sertão da Bahia
 Hasselblad Award | 2011 | Downtown Los Angeles
 Abril Award | 2012 | Best Photo Essay | Santa Catarina
 XII Prêmio Funarte Marc Ferrez de Fotografia | 2012 | A Serra de Santa Catarina - um Outro Brasil

Exhibits
2021 Paris Photo - Galeria Lume (Paris) | Sertão da Bahia | solo
2019 Galeria Murilo de Castro (Belo Horizonte) | Machina Mundi Nova York | group
2019 Galeria Carbono | Machina Mundi Toscana | solo
2019 Galeria Lume (São Paulo) | Machina Mundi New York | solo
2017  Musee de L'Homme (Paris) | Sertão da Bahia | group
2018 Galeria Arte 57 (São Paulo) | Machina Mundi New York | group
 2017  Galeria Barbado (Lisboa) | Machina Mundi | solo
 2016  Museu Olímpico de Lausanne (Switzerland) | Rio de Janeiro | group
 2016  Le Magazyn (Los Angeles) | Venice Beach | solo
 2016  Galeria Lume (São Paulo) | Machina Mundi | solo
 2015  Galeria Pinakotheke | Rio de Janeiro | solo
 2015   MUBE (São Paulo) | O Paradoxo do Olhar | solo
 2015   SP Arte - Galeria Lume | Aeromodelismo | group
 2015   SP Foto - Galeria Lume | Rio de Janeiro | group
 2015   SP Foto - Galeria Arte 57 | Aeromodelismo | group
 2015   ArtRio - Galeria Arte 57 | Aeromodelismo | group
2014   Galeria Garzon (Punta Del Leste) | O Paradoxo do Olhar | solo
 2014   Museu Oscar Niemeyer (Curitiba) | Sertão da Bahia | group
 2014   SP Foto - Pequena Galeria | Sertão da Bahia | group
 2014   SP Foto - Galeria Arte 57 | Rio de Janeiro | group
 2014   ArtRio - Galeria Arte 57 | Rio de Janeiro | group
 2014   La Quatrième Image (Paris) | Madness | solo
 2013   La Quatrième Image (Paris) | Sertão da Bahia | solo
 2013   ArtRIo - Galeria Arte 57 | Rio de Janeiro | group
 2013   ArtRio - Pequena Galeria | Sertão da Bahia | group
 2013   SP Arte - Galeria Arte 57 | Veneza | group
 2013   SP Arte - Pequena Galeria | Sertão da Bahia | group
 2013   SP Arte - Galeria Arte 57 | Veneza | group
 2013   SP Arte - Galeria Lume | Sertão da Bahia | group
 2013   SP Arte - Pequena Galeria | Sertão da Bahia | group
 2013   SP Arte - Fotospot | New York | group
2013   Estudio Madalena CEI | São Paulo | solo
 2013   Instituto Tomie Ohtake | São Paulo | group
 2012   ArtRIo - Pequena Galeria (Rio de Janeiro) | Sertão da Bahia | group
 2012   ArtRio - Galeria Arte 57 (Rio de Janeiro) | Rio de Janeiro BW | group
 2012   SP Arte-Foto - Pequena Galeria (São Paulo) | Bahia | group
 2012   SP Arte-Foto - Galeria Arte 57 (São Paulo) | Downtown LA | group
 2012   Museu da Imagem e do Som (São Paulo) | Sertão da Bahia | solo 
 2012   Athena Galeria de Arte (Rio de Janeiro) | Rio e Sertão da Bahia | group 
 2011   Samuel Owen Gallery (Connecticut) | São Paulo | group
 2011   Maison Europeénne de la Photographie | Rio | group
 2011   Athena Galeria de Arte (Rio de Janeiro) | Rio | group
 2011   SIM (Curitiba) | Santa Catarina | group
 2011   Casa 11 Photo (Rio de Janeiro) | Santa Catarina e São Paulo | group
 2011   Galeria Maria Baró | Amazônia | group
 2011   ArtRio - Galeria Athena (Rio de Janeiro) | Rio | group
 2011   SP Arte Foto - Galeria Arte 57 (São Paulo) | Santa Catarina | group 
 2011   SP Arte - Galeria Arte 57 (São Paulo) | Santa Catarina | group
 2010   Arterix (São Paulo) | Sertão da Bahia | solo
 2010   1500 Gallery (New York) | São Paulo | solo 
 2010   SP Arte Foto - Galeria arte 57 ( São Paulo) | Amazônia | group
 2010   SP Arte - Galeria arte 57 ( São Paulo) | Amazônia | group 
 2009   Espaço de Arte Trio (São Paulo) | Paris | solo 
 2009   SP Arte Foto - Galeria arte 57 ( São Paulo) | Paris | group
 2009   SP Arte - Galeria arte 57 ( São Paulo) | Paris | coletiva
 2009   Galeria Arte 57 (São Paulo) | São Paulo | solo
 2008   iContemporânea - Galeria Arte 57 (São Paulo) | São Paulo | solo
 2008   SP Arte - Galeria Arte 57 ( São Paulo) | Madness | solo
 2007   iContemporânea - Galeria Arte 57 (São Paulo) | Rio | solo
 2007   Galeria Arte 57 ( São Paulo) | Flesh and Spirit | solo
 2006   SP Arte - Galeria Arte 57 (São Paulo) | Sertão da Bahia | solo
 2005   Palazzo Magnani (Milão) | Madness | solo
 2003   Galeria Leica (São Paulo) | Rio | solo
 2003   Photo España (Madrid) | Madness | solo
 2001   Museu de Arte Moderna (São Paulo) | Cityscapes | solo
 2000   Centro Cultural Banco do Brasil (Rio de Janeiro) | Portraits | solo
 1999   Higashikawa Photo Fest (Japão) | Carnaval | solo
 1999   Fotogaleria Li (São Paulo) | Portraits | solo
 1997   Centro Cultural Banco do Brasil (Rio de Janeiro) | Carnaval | solo
 1996   Museu Metropolitano de Curitiba | Carnaval| solo
 1996   Museu da Imagem e do Som (São Paulo) | Carnaval | solo
 1995   Galeria Fotóptica (São Paulo) | Old Havana | solo
 1993   Maine Photographic Workshop (USA) | India | solo
 1992   Galeria Cândido Mendes (Rio de Janeiro) | Madness | solo
 1991   Visa Pour L’Image (Perpignam, France) | Madness | solo
 1991   Museu de Arte de São Paulo | Pirelli Collection | solo
 1990   Galeria Fotoptica (São Paulo) | Madness | solo
 1990   Drew University (USA) | India, Madness, Hassidic Jews| solo
 1988   Galeria Fotoptica (São Paulo) | India | solo
 1985   Museu de Arte Contemporânea (São Paulo) | Trienal de Fotografia | solo 
 1984   Galeria Arco (São Paulo) | Venice Beach | solo
 1983   Centre Georges Pompidou (Paris) | Brazilian Photography | solo
 1983   Photographer’s Gallery (London) | Brazilian Photography | solo
 1980   Parson's School of Design (New York) | Hassidic Jews | solo
 1978   International Center of Photography (New York) | Hassidic Jews | solo 
 1976   Museu de Arte de São Paulo | São Paulo | group
 1975   Museu de Arte de São Paulo | Martinelli | solo

Teaching and lecturing

 The New School/Parson’s School of Design | teacher from 1979 to 1994.
 International Center of Photography | teacher from 1992 to 1995,
 The Maine Photographic Workshop | teacher from 1991 to 1993,
 New York University | 1985 | Lecture,
 School of Visual Arts | 1980/81/82 | Lecture,
 Drew University | 1990 | Lecture,
 Workshop | Jornal “O Globo”
 Workshop | Editora Abril
 Museu de Arte de São Paulo, Brazil | 1988 | Palestra
 Workshop | Paraty em Foco | 2006/07/08/09/10/11/12/13/14 
 Workshop | Diversidade | Fortaleza | 2010
 Workshop | Foto Porto Alegre | 2009
 Workshop | Tiradentes Foto em Pauta | 2011/12/13/14
 Workshop e Palestra | Canela Foto Workshops | 2013
 Workshop | CASA DO SABER | 2013/14 | História da fotografia
 Workshop | CASA DO SABER | 2013/14 | Fotografia e Impressionismo

Work in the collections of 

 AT&T Photo Collection • Adriana Rondon • Alberto de Carvalho Alves • Alfredo Setubal • Aline de Almeida Prado 
 Ana Luiza Brant de Carvalho e Nerval Ferreira Braga • Ana Vitória Mota • Anna Alvarenga • Antonia Galdeano 
 Ataide Vaz • Antonio Carlos e Bibia Cunha Lima • Banco Itaú • Beatriz Vidigal Araújo • Bernardo e Celia Parnes 
 Betina e Gilberto Martins Ferreira • Betty Cunali • Bianca Cutait • Bianca Rainer • Bianca Munis 
 Bibia e Neno Cunha Lima • Brazil Golden Art Fund • Bruno Musatti • Carlos e Maria Emilia Carvalhosa 
 Carla Ferraro • Carmen de Barros • Centro Cultural Banco do Brasil • Cliff Lee • Charlô Whately • Christina Cunali
 Claudia Belinello • Claudia Jaguaribe • Credit Suisse • Dado Castello Branco • Daniel Feffer • David Feffer 
 Claudia e João Nercessian • Denise Aguiar Alvarez 

 Dudu e Mara Linhares • Eder Chiodetto • Edu e Helô Muylaert • Dr. Eduardo Villaça • Elias Landsberger 
 Elisa Pacheco Fernandes • Equity International Photo Collection • Esther Giobbi • Fanny Feffer • Felipe Feitosa 
 Flavia Soares • Flavio e Bia Bitelman • Fernando Ullmann • Greg e Claudia Sanchotene • Higashikawa Photofest (Japão)
 Gustavo Lacerda • Helô Monteiro da Silva • Helena e Toninho de Castro Sannini • Illia e Ana Maria Warchavchic
 International Center of Photography | New York • Itaú Cultura | São Paulo • Jay Colton • João e Fatima Farkas
 João Marcos Mendes de Souza • Joelma Radziuk • Joaquim Paiva • João Paulo e Adriana Cunha Lima
 João Paulo Diniz • Jorge e Janja Gonçalves • Jorginho da Cunha Lima • José Augusto de Santana • José Roberto Marinho 
 José Olavo Scarabotolo • Juan Esteves • Jussara Magnami • Leonel Kaz • Ligia Danesi • Ligia Maura Costa
 Lisa Sander • Lourdinha Siqueira • Lucia Hauptmann • Luis Fernando e Maribel T. Neves • Luzia de Magalhães Padilha
 Maison Europeene de La Photographie (Paris) • MAC - Museu de Arte Contemporânea | São Paulo 
 Malan Ferreira • MAM - Museu de Arte Moderna | São Paulo • Marcelo e Carol Filardi
 Maná Soares • Mariana Almeida Prado • Mariana e Ricardo Annunciato 
 Marilisa Cardoso e José Eduardo de Lacerda Soares • Maria Emilia Cunali • Mark Whitley • Marli Mariano 
 MASP - Museu de Arte de S. Paulo • Museu da Imagem e do Som | São Paulo • Museu Metronòm | Barcelona
 Museu Metropolitano de Curitiba • Marcel Jung • Nerval e Bize Ferreira Braga • Nina Sander • Oswaldo Pepe 
 Otávio R. Macedo • Coleção Pirelli • Paula Palhares e Rubens Fernandes Junior • Patricia Mendes Caldeira
 Raquel Correa de Oliveira • Renato Ganhito • Renato Magalhães Gouvêa Jr. • Renato Padro Costa • Ricardo Moraes
 Ricardo Queiroz • Roberta Rossetto • Roberto Carvalho • Roberto Ruhman • Rodrigo Ribeiro 
 Sandra Arruda e Andre Balbi • Sergio Gantmanis Munis • Silvio Bentes • Silvio Frota • Simonetta Persichetti
 Thomas Farkas • Tutu e Sérgio Galvão Bueno • Vanessa Gantmanis e Ivan Munis
 Visa Pour L' Image | Perpignam | França • Yael e Claudio Steiner

Editorial credits

 American Photo • Art News • Business Week • Bons Fluidos • Boston Globe • Bravo
 Casa Claudia Luxo • Claudia • Conde Nast's Traveler • Daily Telegraph of London • Details • Elle • Epoca
 Estado de São Paulo • Folha de S.Paulo • Forbes • Fortune • Fotosite • Fotografe Melhor 
 Digital Photographer • Isto é • Joyce Pascowitch • Life • Los Angeles Times • Marie Claire • Money
 National Geographic • Newsweek • The New York Times Magazine • Nico • Oi • Poder • Photo France 
 Photo Italy • Photo District News • Paris Match • People • Playboy • República • Rolling Stone • Self
 The Smithsonian • Sports Illustrated • Stern • Time  • Town & Country • Travel & Leisure • USA Today
 US • US News • Valor • Vanity Fair • Veja • Washington Post

References

Bibliography

 Edinger, Claudio (2009). Paris, apesar de tudo. Poder Joyce Pascowitch (11) 52-59.
 Mello, C. Hélio (2009). Foco na sensibilidade. Brasileiras (20) 28-29.
 Gonçalves, N. Daniel (2009). Mistérios da cidade. Veja São Paulo (42-10) 15.
 Pan (2007). MNP (34) 74-83.
 Girls of Ipanema. (2007). Nico (summer 2007) 162-171.
 O olhar do pesquisador (2007). Fhox (114) 78-79.
 Revelou-se a sua enorme curtição. (2007). Próxima Viagem (89) 44-45.
 Jeito carioca (2007). Gol (60) 64-67.
 Edinger, Claudio (2006). De jesus a milagres. Revista Fotosite (10) 29-34.
 Elias, Érico (2006). História de um ensaísta versátil. Fotografe Melhor (113) 38-45.
 Rocha, Flávia (2006) Por um sertão imortal. Casa Vogue (250) 184-187.
 Les grands maîtres du Brésil. (2005). Photo (420) 86.
 Edinger, Claudio (2005) Fotografia na chapa. Revista Fotosite (5) 50-55.
 A-List Special Interests. (2003). Travel+Leisure (9) 152.

External links
 Paraty em Foco 2009 - Entrevista 
 Shutterbug Staff. (2006) Brazilian Photographer Claudio Edinger Reveals Art of the Picture Essay at Kingston.com
 Photo.Box.Sk. About my photography - Claudio Edinger
 Metrópolis. (2009) Entrevista com o fotógrafo Claudio Edinger
 Fotoritim. Claudio Edinger : Delilik
 Festa Literária Internacional de Parati. (2008) Claudio Edinger na Galeria Zoom 
 Coleção Pirelli / Masp de Fotografia. Biografia Claudio Edinger
 Itaú Cultural. Biografia de Claudio Edinger
 extended stay hotels near me
 http://fotosite.terra.com.br/novo_futuro/barme.php?http://fotosite.terra.com.br/novo_futuro/ler_coluna.php?id=319
 http://fotosite.terra.com.br/especiais_arquivo/claudioedinger.htm
 http://fotosite.terra.com.br/novo_futuro/barme.php?http://fotosite.terra.com.br/novo_futuro/ler_noticia.php?id=4087
 http://fotosite.terra.com.br/novo_futuro/barme.php?http://fotosite.terra.com.br/novo_futuro/ler_coluna.php?id=93
 http://fotosite.terra.com.br/novo_futuro/portfolio_pop.php?id=336

Brazilian photographers
1952 births
Living people
Smithsonian (magazine) people